Juan Balboa Boneke (9 June 1938 – 10 March 2014) was an Equatorial Guinean politician and writer.

He was born in Rebola, Spanish Guinea and studied at the Escuela Superior de Santa Isabel and at La Escuela social de Granada. He was minister under Teodoro Obiang until he dissented with the dictatorship's policies and went into exile in Valencia, Spain. Prior to his position in the Guinean government, he would live for over 15 years in Majorca (where his daughter María Concepción, a flamenco singer best known as Concha Buika, was born). After his exile, he settled down in Valencia with his second wife and her family.

Balboa Boneke died from renal problems, coupled with a three-year depression caused by the death of his wife, on 10 March 2014 in Valencia, Spain.

Books 
¿A dónde vas Guinea?", Palma de Mallorca, 1978.
O Boriba (el exiliado), 1982.
Desde mi vidriera, 1983.
El Reencuentro: El retorno del exiliado, Ediciones Guinea, D.L. 1985 (Fuenlabrada : Anzos).
 Sueños en mi selva: (antología poética), Centro Cultural Hispano-Guineano, D.L 1987.
 La transición de Guinea Ecuatorial : historia de un fracaso.  Madrid : Labrys 54, 1996.

References

1938 births
2014 deaths
Fernandino people
People of Bubi descent
Equatoguinean writers
Equatoguinean male writers
Government ministers of Equatorial Guinea
Equatoguinean exiles
Deaths from kidney failure
People from Bioko Norte
20th-century politicians
20th-century writers
20th-century male writers